José Marcelino (born 8 April 1950 Died 14 September 2022) was a Brazilian volleyball player. He competed in the men's tournament at the 1972 Summer Olympics., Died 14-09-2022 https://www1.folha.uol.com.br/amp/cotidiano/2022/09/mortes-referencia-no-volei-brasileiro-compartilhou-suas-historias-no-esporte.shtml

References

1950 births
Living people
Brazilian men's volleyball players
Olympic volleyball players of Brazil
Volleyball players at the 1972 Summer Olympics
Sportspeople from Santos, São Paulo